Joshua Whatmough (June 30, 1897April 25, 1964) was a linguist, professor, writer from Rochdale, Lancashire who served as the president of the Linguistics Society of America in 1951. He was also the chairman of the department of linguistics at Harvard University from 1926 to his retirement in 1963. He studied comparative philology and classics at the University of Manchester and the University of Cambridge.

Biography 
Whatmough was born in Rochdale, England, the son of iron moulder and a wool weaver Walter and Elizabeth (née Hollows) Whatmough. He received a Master of Arts degree from the University of Manchester in 1919. He graduated also with an M.A. from Emmanuel College, Cambridge in 1926. He additionally received an honorary doctorate from the University of Dublin. His first teaching job was at the University College of North Wales. He was married to G. Verona Taylor with whom he had 2 children.

References 

Linguists from England
Harvard University faculty
1897 births
1964 deaths
People from Rochdale
Linguistic Society of America presidents